Arcobacter venerupis is a species of Gram-negative, slightly curved motile rod-shaped bacteria. It was first recovered from mussels and clams. Its type strain is F4(T)=CECT 7835(T)=LMG 26154(T)).

References

Further reading
Figueras, María José, Arturo Levican, and Luis Collado. "Updated 16S rRNA-RFLP method for the identification of all currently characterised Arcobacter spp." BMC Microbiology 12.1 (2012): 292.
Jyothsna, TS Sasi, et al. "Arcobacter anaerophilus sp. nov., isolated from an estuarine sediment and emended description of the genus Arcobacter."International Journal of Systematic and Evolutionary Microbiology 63.Pt 12 (2013): 4619–4625.

External links
LPSN

Campylobacterota
Bacteria described in 2012